Jochen Carow (born February 10, 1944) is a German former footballer.

External links

1944 births
Living people
German footballers
East German footballers
East Germany international footballers
Berliner FC Dynamo players
DDR-Oberliga players
Association football defenders